CHRB (1140 AM, AM 1140) is a radio station licensed to High River, Alberta. Owned by Golden West Broadcasting, it broadcasts a christian format.

It first began broadcasting in 1977 at 1280 kHz before moving to its current dial position in 1996. CHRB is a Class B station broadcasting on a clear-channel frequency with daytime power of 50,000 watts, and nighttime power of 46,000 watts; a directional antenna is used at all times. Its Class B status indicates that it is not a clear-channel station, but it does broadcast on the clear-channel frequency of 1140 AM, on which Class A status is shared by Mexico and the U.S.

References

External links
 
 
 
 
 

Hrb
Hrb
Hrb
Hrb
High River
Radio stations established in 1977
1977 establishments in Alberta